Salisbury Island, (Russian: Остров Солсбери; Ostrov Solsberi) is an island located in the central area of Franz Josef Land, Russia.

Geography
Salisbury Island is relatively large and long, having a surface of 960 km². Its highest point is 482 m and practically the entire surface of the island is glacierized.

Salisbury Island is part of the Zichy Land subgroup of the Franz Josef Archipelago. It has very little open sea around it, being wedged between Luigi Island and Champ Island on its southwestern shores, Ziegler Island in the northeast and Wiener Neustadt Island in the east.

The island was named by Frederick George Jackson during his 1894–1897 expedition. A possible source for the name is geology professor Rollin D. Salisbury (1858-1922), of the University of Chicago. Salisbury was second-in-command on the Peary relief expedition. It is also possible that Jackson named the island after Lord Salisbury.

Adjacent Islands
Elisabeth Island (Остров Елизаветы; Ostrov Yelizavety) is a 5 km long oval-shaped island lying 7 km off Salisbury Island's northwestern end. Unglacierized; highest point 121 m. Frederick George Jackson named this island after his mother, Mary Elizabeth Jackson.
Ostrova Kuchina (Острова Кучина). These are two very small islets off Salisbury Island's northeastern coast; one of them is very close to the shore. They were named after Russian Arctic explorer Alexander Kuchin, the only Russian on Amundsen’s expedition to the South Pole on the Fram. Kuchin was lost in Vladimir Rusanov's ill-fated expedition from Spitsbergen on ship Gerkules in 1912.

References

  
 Islands - Unep 
 Rollin D. Salisbury
 Names in Russian: :ru:Список островов России

Islands of Franz Josef Land
Islands of Arkhangelsk Oblast